The North Eastern Football Union (NEFU) was an Australian Rules football competition in North-Eastern Tasmania, Australia.

History
Competition football began in North-Eastern Tasmania in the early 1900s during the region's tin mining boom. 
There were many small associations existing in the area from Scottsdale to Goulds Country, with the many varying changes to the region during the twentieth century it had a resultant effect on the football scene. 
After the NEFU formed in 1938, the competition ran until it was suspended during World War Two, football resumed in 1945. 
The governing body reformed under the guidance of Harry Horsburg as Secretary and George De Haas as president.
The North Eastern Football Union clubs in that era were Branxholm, Derby, Legerwood, Pioneer, Ringarooma and Winnaleah. 
In 1967, Bridport Football Club joined the competition along with Scottsdale Crows (1982), Lilydale (1985), Saint Helens (1993 from the defunct Fingal District FA) and Fingal (1997).

Lilydale left at the end of 2010, Ringarooma went into recess in 2012 and St Helens changed its name to East Coast Swans to have a more regional appeal in 2013. Branxholm went into recess then Bridport and East Coast joined the NTFA.

In 2017 the competition was reduced to just two clubs. In a farcical situation, Winneleah defeated Scottsdale Crows in all 12 home and away matches and the grand final. The Crows folded soon after. Winneleah applied to join the NTFA but were rejected, so the club were forced to fold.

Former Clubs
  - Branxholm Football Club
  - Bridport Football Club
  - East Coast Swans Football Club
  - Scottsdale Crows Football Club
  - Winnaleah Football Club
  - Ringarooma Football Club
  - Saint Helens Football Club
 Fingal Football club
 Lilydale Football Club
 Derby Football Club
 Legerwood Football Club
 Alberton Football club
 Pioneer Football Club
 Pioneer-Gladstone Football Club
 Scottsdale Football Club
 Wanderers Football Club

2007 Ladder

2008 Ladder

2009 Ladder

2010 Ladder

2011 Ladder

2012 Ladder

2013 Ladder

2014 Ladder

2015 Ladder

2016 Ladder

2017 Ladder

Premiers

1938 Branxholm
1939 Scottsdale
1940 Winnaleah
1941-1944 WWII
1945 Winnaleah
1946 Scottsdale
1947 Scottsdale
1948 Branxholm
1949 Derby
1950 Derby
1951 Branxholm
1952 Legerwood
1953 Derby
1954 Derby
1955 Ringarooma
1956 Branxholm
1957 Derby
1958 Branxholm
1959 Branxholm
1960 Derby
1961 Branxholm
1962 Branxholm
1963 Branxholm
1964 Branxholm
1965 Winnaleah
1966 Branxholm

1967 Pioneer
1968 Ringarooma
1969 Ringarooma
1970 Branxholm
1971 Ringarooma
1972 Winnaleah
1973 Bridport
1974 Winnaleah
1975 Ringarooma
1976 Pioneer
1977 Pioneer
1978 Pioneer
1979 Branxholm
1980 Ringarooma
1981 Ringarooma
1982 Bridport
1983 Ringarooma
1984 Ringarooma
1985 Winnaleah
1986 Lilydale
1987 Branxholm
1988 Lilydale
1989 Scottsdale Crows
1990 Scottsdale Crows
1991 Ringarooma
1992 Lilydale

1993 Bridport
1994 Lilydale
1995 Branxholm
1996 Branxholm
1997 St. Helens
1998 Fingal
1999 Bridport
2000 St. Helens
2001 Bridport
2002 Bridport
2003 Winnaleah
2004 Winnaleah
2005 Winnaleah
2006 Scottsdale Crows
2007 Lilydale
2008 Ringarooma
2009 Lilydale
2010 Lilydale
2011 Winnaleah
2012 Winnaleah
2013 Bridport
2014 Branxholm
2015 Bridport
2016 Winnaleah
2017 Winneleah

published books 

Australian rules football in Tasmania, John Stoward, 2002, 
More on football, B.T. (Buck) Anderton. , Central Coast Courier, 2002,

External links 
Official NEFU Website

References

Defunct Australian rules football competitions in Tasmania